"Heavensent" is the first single released from Australian rock band Killing Heidi's second album, Present (2002). The song reached number 28 on the Australian Singles Chart.

Awards and nominations
Nominations
 2002 ARIA Awards, Best Independent Release

Track listing
CD single
 "Heavensent" (radio mix)
 "Heavensent" (Psy Harmonics remix—radio edit)
 "Up & Down" (live in Violet Town)
 "What You Say I'll Do" (live in Violet Town)
 "Nutha F..ken Love Song" (live in Violet Town)
 "Heavensent" (Psy Harmonics remix—full version)

Chart performance
"Heavensent" debuted on the Australian ARIA Singles Chart at 31 on 16 December 2001. In its fifth week, it peaked at 28. It then stayed in the top 50 for a further two weeks.

Weekly charts

Certification

References

2000 songs
2001 singles
Columbia Records singles
Killing Heidi songs
Songs written by Ella Hooper
Songs written by Jesse Hooper